are a type of Japanese textile used for gift-wrapping or for purifying equipment during a Japanese tea ceremony.  are square or almost square pieces of lined fabric ranging in size from about  along one side. They are typically made of fine silk, and may be decorated with embroidery in auspicious designs.

Use
Traditionally in Japan, gifts were placed in boxes or on a wooden or lacquered tray, over which a  would be draped. The choice of a  appropriate to the occasion was considered an important part of the gift itself, and part of its formality. The practice of covering a gift became widespread during the Edo period (1603-1867).

The richness of the decoration of the  attests to the giver's wealth and aesthetics.

This was one of many subtle devices used to control the wealth of the aristocratic and samurai classes.

History
The practice of covering a gift became widespread during the Edo period (1603-1867). In the Edo period, textiles, which had long been an integral part of Japanese art, were developed further through the rising wealth of the merchant classes, whose disposable income allowed them to imitate the upper classes through the patronage of textile artists, dyers and embroiderers. Unlike Western art, Japanese art did not arbitrarily divide between fine arts and decorative arts, and a number of eminent artists were commissioned to design textiles, including ; however, artists seldom signed their work.

In the first part of the 18th century, the typical decoration of a  reflected the tastes of the aristocracy. The subtle cultural references inherent in their designs would be recognizable only to the educated members of the upper classes, who lived and exchanged gifts in the cities of Kyoto and Edo (modern-day Tokyo) and their surrounding areas. 

Today,  are rarely used, and when they are it is almost exclusively around Tokyo and Kyoto for gifts given at the time of marriage.

Decoration

Satin silk was the preferred fabric for embroidered , which often made extensive couched gold- and silver-wrapped thread. As paste-resist dyeing became popular, crepe silk ( or ) was favored.

Themes and motifs
 Nature: Nature motifs were common, particularly auspicious combinations such as the "Three Friends of Winter", a combination of pine, plum blossom and bamboo, considered to symbolise constancy and integrity.
 Auspicious birds and animals: Mandarin cranes and turtles with a trailing tail of algae were used, representing longevity and good fortune.
Bamboo curtains, screens, books, imperial carts, fans and other items reminiscent of the Heian period were used as auspicious designs from the Edo period. Games such as shell- and card-matching games were also featured.
 Folktales and mythology: scenes or motifs from traditional Japanese folktales, such as Urashima Tarō and the Tale of Takasago, were used to decorate  as a form of cultural reference.

in tea ceremony

Tea ceremony  are always made of silk.

Those used by men are usually deep purple, while those used by women are usually red or orange. Other colours are sometimes used, as are  decorated with images.
  are larger squares of silk with various patterns used by hosts and guests to handle  (tea bowls) during certain , usually those involving the making of thick tea, in some tea traditions.

See also

References
 Fukusa, The Shojiro Nomura Fukusa Collection, by Mary Hays and Ralph Hays, 1983 (Mills College), published in connection with its exhibition of the same title
 Fukusa, the Gift Cover – the Beauty of Exchanging Gifts, catalogue for show organized by the Tokyo Metropolitan Foundation for History and Culture for the  exhibit at the Kyoto National Museum, August 24–September 8, 1991.
 Fukusa, Japanese Gift Covers, by Takemura, Akihiko, 1991 (Iwasaki Bijutsu-sha, Tokyo). 
 "Fukusa: Textile Gift Covers", by Peter Sinton Spring 2007 Daruma Magazine (issue 54).
 Fukusa: Silk, Gold and the World's Most Elegant Return Receipt, catalogue for exhibit at Orientations Gallery in New York, 1990.

External links

Victoria and Albert Museum, Story on a fukusa: obtained from the emperor by a misunderstanding

Chadō
Japanese culture
Textile arts of Japan
Japanese words and phrases
Shinto religious objects